Giovanni del Fantasia (1670–1743) was an Italian architect and engineer, operating in a Baroque style, mainly in and around Livorno, region of Tuscany, Italy.

He served as Provedditore of the Regia Fabbriche of Livorno.

Among his works in Livorno are:
Palazzo di Giustizia, Livorno
Palazzo Comunale, Livorno (1731)
Santa Caterina, Livorno (1720)
San Gregorio Illuminatore, Livorno 
Church of Luogo Pio, Livorno
Work at the Sanctuary of Montenero, Livorno (1720)
Chapel of the Santissimo Sacramento, Duomo of Livorno
Church of the orphanage

References

18th-century Italian people
Architects from Tuscany
18th-century Italian architects
1670 births
1743 deaths